Tamboo! is an album by Les Baxter, His Chorus and Orchestra. It was released in 1955 on the Capitol label (catalog nos. T-655).

The album debuted on Billboard magazine's popular albums chart on January 28, 1956, peaked at No. 6, and remained on that chart for two weeks.

AllMusic later gave the album a rating of four-and-a-half stars. Reviewer Jo-Ann Greene wrote: "It's brilliantly done, and helped to broaden American minds and widen musical views."

Track listing
Side 1
 "Simba"
 "Oasis of Dakhla"
 "Maracaibo"
 "Tehran"
 "Pantan"
 "Havana"

Side 2
 "Mozambique"
 "Wotuka"
 "Cuchibamba"
 "Batumba"
 "Rio"
 "Zambezi"

References

1955 albums
Capitol Records albums
Les Baxter albums